Shane Sweet (born January 6, 1986) is an American actor, known for his role as Josh Stevenson on the Nickelodeon series The Journey of Allen Strange. He is also one of the voice actors for Tim Drake / Robin in the DC Animated Universe as well as a few appearances as Seven Wanker on the Fox sitcom Married... with Children and Figure It Out as a panelist.

References

External links 
 

1986 births
20th-century American male actors
21st-century American male actors
Living people
American male child actors
American male television actors
Male actors from Burbank, California